Anthony Howard Ensor (born 17 August 1949, Dublin, Ireland), commonly called Tony Ensor, was an Ireland rugby union player.

Ensor was born in Dublin, the second of five children. He is the nephew of the 7th Chief Justice of Ireland Thomas Finlay and Supreme Court judge John Blayney. Educated at Gonzaga College and UCD, he played for UCD and Wanderers. He made his international  debut on 10 March 1973 against Wales. He was capped 22 times for Ireland, winning his last cap against England on 18 March 1978.

A full back, Tony's only try for Ireland came in 1975 against France. He was also a goal kicker and scored a total of 31 points for his country. In 1976 he was also a member of the Ireland squad that toured New Zealand and Fiji.

A solicitor by profession, Tony practises in Enniscorthy, County Wexford.

He served as president of the Law Society of Ireland in 1999.

He now lives in Ballinapark, Bunclody, County Wexford with his wife Beatrice. He has two children.

References

External links 
 Statistics by scrum.com

1949 births
Living people
Rugby union players from Dublin (city)
Irish rugby union players
Ireland international rugby union players
Alumni of University College Dublin
Wanderers F.C. (rugby union) players
University College Dublin R.F.C. players
People educated at Gonzaga College
Rugby union fullbacks